Roger Bernhardt (born October 14, 1949) is a former American football guard. He played for the New York Jets in 1974 and for the Kansas City Chiefs in 1975.

References

1949 births
Living people
American football guards
Kansas Jayhawks football players
New York Jets players
Kansas City Chiefs players